Doriane Pin (born 6 January 2004 in Paris) is a racing driver from France. She is the reigning Ferrari Challenge Europe champion and is competing in the FIA World Endurance Championship and European Le Mans Series.

Career

Karting
Having started karting at the age of nine, Pin began competing in the national championship in 2016. She remained in the competition for the next three years, finishing 10th and 5th respectively in the junior class before winning the female category in 2019. The Frenchwoman also took part in the FIA Motorsport Games in the Karting Slalom Cup alongside Esteban Masson.

Renault Clio Cup
In 2020, Pin made her car racing debut, competing for GPA Racing in the Renault Clio Cup France. She drove in the first three events of the campaign, scoring a best finish of ninth, before leaving the series.

Le Mans Cup
Progressing to full-time competition in 2021, the Frenchwoman moved into the GT3 class of the Le Mans Cup, racing for Iron Lynx. She scored five podiums and ended up fifth in the drivers' standings.

FIA Formula 3
Pin was selected to take part in a one-day FIA Formula 3 test at Magny-Cours in November 2021, alongside fellow Iron Dames racer Maya Weug and W Series drivers Nerea Martí and Irina Sidorkova.

Ferrari Challenge Europe

2021 
In 2021, Pin made her debut in the Ferrari Challenge Europe in the Pro category, finishing sixth in both races at Le Castellet.

2022 
The following year, she remained with Scuderia Niki Hasler - Iron Lynx for a full season of the Ferrari Challenge. Pin would dominate, winning nine out of 14 races, scoring ten pole positions and eleven fastest laps respectively and clinching the title with one round remaining. She later stated that she had "really [grown] during this year", explaining that the season taught her how to better relay feedback to her team.

European Le Mans Series 
After the third round of the European Le Mans Series campaign the Frenchwoman replaced Rahel Frey in the all-female Iron Lynx lineup for the remainder of the 2022 season. Despite an early retirement at Barcelona, the squad were able to finish second in the following race at Spa-Francorchamps, where Pin set the fastest lap of the race in the GTE category. The season finale held at the Algarve International Circuit brought even more success for Pin and her teammates, with a pole position being followed up by the team's first victory in the series' history.

World Endurance Championship 
As a prize for her 2022 season, Pin was invited to take part in the FIA World Endurance Championship rookie test to be held in Bahrain on the day after the last race of the season, where she drove the LMP2 title-winning Jota car.

Pin would make her prototype debut in 2023, partnering Mirko Bortolotti and Daniil Kvyat as the silver-ranked driver of Prema Racing in the WEC. Having been praised by Bortolotti after the series prologue, the official pre-season test, the Frenchwoman took her first podium of her LMP2 tenure, finishing third after Bortolotti had pitted for fuel from the lead with mere minutes to go.

Karting record

Karting career summary

Racing record

Racing career summary

† As Pin was a guest driver, she was ineligible for points.* Season still in progress.

Complete FIA Motorsport Games results

Complete Renault Clio Cup France results
(key) (Races in bold indicate pole position) (Races in italics indicate fastest lap)

Complete Le Mans Cup results
(key) (Races in bold indicate pole position) (Races in italics indicate fastest lap)

Complete Ferrari Challenge Europe results
(key) (Races in bold indicate pole position) (Races in italics indicate fastest lap)

Ferrari Challenge Finali Mondiali results

Complete FIA World Endurance Championship results
(key) (Races in bold indicate pole position) (Races in italics indicate fastest lap)

* Season still in progress.

Complete 24 Hours of Spa results

Complete European Le Mans Series results
(key) (Races in bold indicate pole position) (Races in italics indicate fastest lap)

* Season still in progress.

Complete IMSA SportsCar Championship results
(key) (Races in bold indicate pole position; races in italics indicate fastest lap)

References

External links
 Profile at Driver Database
 Official website

French racing drivers
French female racing drivers
Racing drivers from Paris
2004 births
Living people
FIA World Endurance Championship drivers
FIA Motorsport Games drivers
European Le Mans Series drivers
Le Mans Cup drivers
Iron Lynx drivers
WeatherTech SportsCar Championship drivers
Prema Powerteam drivers
Lamborghini Super Trofeo drivers
Ferrari Challenge drivers